The returning soldier effect is a phenomenon which suggests that more boys are born during and immediately after wars. This effect is one of the many factors influencing human sex ratio. 

The phenomenon was first noticed in 1883 by Carl Düsing of the University of Jena, who suggested that it was a natural regulation of the status quo. Writing in 1899, an Australian physician, Arthur Davenport, used Düsing's findings to hypothesize that the cause was the difference between the comparative ill-health of the returning troops compared to the good health of their partners. Research published in 1954 by Brian MacMahon and Thomas F. Pugh showed that the sex ratio of white live-births in the United States had shown a marked increase in favor of boys between 1945 and 1947, with a peak in 1946. In 2007, Satoshi Kanazawa published a paper theorizing that the effect was due to "the fact that taller soldiers are more likely to survive battle and that taller parents are more likely to have sons". This was based on his research of British Army records from the First World War, which showed that "surviving soldiers were on average more than one inch (3.33 cm) taller than fallen soldiers". Valerie Grant attributed it to changing hormone levels of women during war, as they tended to "adopt more dominant roles". William H. James writing in 2008 gave an increase in coital rates by returning soldiers as a possible cause. He also noted that a fall in the ratio of male births had been recorded in Iran following the Iran–Iraq War, "explained by psychological stress causing pregnant women disproportionately to abort male fetuses".

See also

 Killer ape theory

References

Aftermath of war
Military psychiatry
Military medicine
Human sex ratio